Tangyan may refer to:

Tang Yan (actress), a Chinese actor
Tangyan, Burma, in Shan State